Ralph Harold Millon is an American former Negro league infielder who played in the 1940s.

Millon made his Negro leagues debut in 1946 with the Chicago American Giants. The following season he split time between Chicago and the Indianapolis Clowns.

References

External links
 and Seamheads

Year of birth missing
Place of birth missing
Chicago American Giants players
Indianapolis Clowns players
Baseball infielders